Hollow Dreams is the debut studio album by Sri Lanka-based heavy metal band, Stigmata. The album was released in 2003.

Another noteworthy factor is that this was the first heavy metal album released by a Sri Lankan band.

Track listing
 "Thicker than Blood" - 04:08	
 "Hollow Dreams" - 04:30	
 "Andura" - 06:31	
 "Stigmatized" - 11:19	
 "Voices" - 06:03	
 "Harvest of Sin" - 04:21	
 "The Dying Winter Sleeps" - 07:18	
 "Dezra" - 04:11
 "Inspired" - 04:10	
 "Falling Away" - 05:19	
 "Extinction" - 03:56

References

External links
 The Albums Review On The metal Reporter
 Encyclopedia Metallum

2003 debut albums
Stigmata (band) albums